Quinn Thomas McDowell (born January 13, 1990) is an American former professional basketball player and current coach. He currently serves as an assistant coach with the Longwood Lancers men's basketball team.

Professional career
In January 2013, McDowell signed with the Willetton Tigers in Australia for the 2013 State Basketball League season. He was named in the SBL All-Star Five and averaged 29.4 points, 8.2 rebounds, 3.5 assists and 1.0 steals in 26 games.

In November 2013, McDowell joined the Springfield Armor of the NBA Development League. He was waived on February 19, 2014, after averaging 3.5 points and 2.1 rebounds in 22 games. He subsequently returned to Australia and re-joined the Willetton Tigers for the 2014 SBL season. He averaged a league-leading 30.1 points per game to go with 10.3 rebounds, 3.9 assists and 1.1 steals in 23 games.

On September 4, 2014, McDowell signed with Palencia Baloncesto for the 2014–15 LEB Oro season. On March 9, 2015, he injured himself at training and subsequently missed six weeks of action. In 25 games for Palencia, he averaged 11.6 points, 3.9 rebounds and 1.2 assists per game.

On July 24, 2015, McDowell signed with VEF Rīga for the 2015–16 Latvian Basketball League season. He left the team in January 2016. In 11 league games for Rīga, he averaged 7.0 points, 2.2 rebounds and 1.5 assists per game. He also appeared in 16 VTB United League games, averaging 5.6 points and 2.6 rebounds per game.

Coaching career
In August 2016, McDowell was appointed assistant coach of the Virginia Wesleyan Marlins men's basketball team, effectively ending his playing career. Following the 2017–18 season, he accepted a position as the associate head coach at Taylor University in Upland, Indiana. In May 2019, he was appointed assistant coach of the Lehigh Mountain Hawks men's basketball team. Three years later, he joined the coaching staff at Longwood University.

References

External links

Quinn McDowell at tribeathletics.com
Quinn McDowell at vefriga.com
Quinn McDowell at taylor.edu

1990 births
Living people
American expatriate basketball people in Australia
American expatriate basketball people in Latvia
American expatriate basketball people in Spain
American men's basketball players
Basketball coaches from Ohio
Basketball players from Cincinnati
BK VEF Rīga players
Lehigh Mountain Hawks men's basketball coaches
Longwood Lancers men's basketball coaches
Palencia Baloncesto players
People from Mason, Ohio
Shooting guards
Small forwards
Springfield Armor players
Taylor Trojans men's basketball coaches
Virginia Wesleyan Marlins men's basketball coaches
William & Mary Tribe men's basketball players